Stof-Lap Chikapute is the third studio album by Gazza, released in 2005. Gazza adopted a more South African style of kwaito for this album, which includes production by Bu², Becoming Phil, and David Taren. This is Gazza's first album without an appearance by The Dogg.It includes the big hits Kick It, Nobody, Komesho & Summer Song

Track listing 
Intro
Verstaan
Bala Bala feat. Chester, Ghetto Son & Sgem1
Apa Naape
Fresh feat. Diksa
Kick It
Nobody
Komesho
Peng' Omito
Summer Song
My Love
Gangsta
Kick It (Remix) feat. Vambos
Chilizo feat. Chilizo & Propaganda
Afrikaans feat. Auntie Sousa
Jah
Kapuna/Ageko feat. Nicky
Ape Naape Reprise

2005 albums
Albums produced by Elvo
Gazza (musician) albums